NCube (Norwegian CubeSat) was a series of two Norwegian satellites, made by students at several Norwegian universities and university colleges. Due to problems during launch (NCube-1) and deployment into orbit (NCube-2), neither of the satellites became operational.

Both satellites were built to the CubeSat picosatellite standard, which defined their mass and size (10 cm cube). This standard allows one or more cube satellites to be launched by 'piggybacking' with a larger satellite. In this way the smaller satellites get a cheap ride into orbit.

The goal of the NCube satellites was to stimulate interest in science and increase competence in space technology among students and educational institutions. Moreover, enhance cooperation between educational institutions and industry and exchange of knowledge between educational institutions in north and south of Norway.

The second goal was to communicate with amateur radio ground stations, and to test a space-born Automatic Identification System (AIS) receiver for tracking ships and reindeer.

As of 2013, NTNU was developing a 2U CubeSat called NUTS-1.

See also 

 List of CubeSats

References

External links 
 More information and project documents

Satellites of Norway
CubeSats
Student satellites
Satellite launch failures
Spacecraft launched in 2006
Spacecraft launched by Dnepr rockets